Reg Elson FRCS (born 1930) is a British orthopaedic surgeon, who was involved in developing hip replacement techniques.

Elson studied at Cambridge University graduating in 1954. After further training as an orthopaedic trauma surgeon he obtained in 1967 a position the Northern General Hospital in Sheffield.

A founder of the Cavendish Hip Fellowship Trust, he also served as president of the British Hip Society from 1994 to 1996. and of the European Hip Society, of which he also was a founder.

References

External links 

1930 births
Place of birth missing (living people)
Living people
Fellows of the Royal College of Surgeons